James Edward English (March 13, 1812 – March 2, 1890) was a United States Representative and later U.S. Senator from Connecticut, and Governor of Connecticut.

Early life and education
English was born in New Haven, Connecticut and attended the common schools. An apprentice carpenter at the age of 16, he became a successful businessman, establishing the English and Welch Lumber Company, and restructuring the New Haven Clock Company into one of the largest clock manufacturers. He was twice married, to Caroline A. Fowler and to Anna Robinson Morris. He had four children.

Career
English engaged in the lumber business, banking, and manufacturing. He was a member of the New Haven board of selectmen from 1847 to 1861, and a member of the common council in 1848 and 1849. He was a member of the Connecticut House of Representatives in 1855 and of the Connecticut Senate from 1856 to 1858, and was an unsuccessful candidate for lieutenant governor in 1860.

English was elected as a Democrat to the Thirty-seventh and Thirty-eighth Congresses, serving from March 4, 1861 to March 3, 1865.  He was not a candidate for renomination in 1864.

He left his ill wife to vote at the U.S. Capitol, where, despite being a Democrat, he voted in favor of the Thirteenth Amendment abolishing slavery in 1864. His "aye" prompted applause "and the tide turned." He later remarked that voting for the Amendment ruined his standing among Democrats, but he thought it the right thing to do, saying "I suppose I am politically ruined, but that day was the happiest of my life." However, his reservation was not to be, as he had a fairly successful career afterwards.

Unsuccessful in his 1866 gubernatorial bid, English was elected Connecticut's 26th governor on April 1, 1867, serving from May 1, 1867 to May 5, 1869. He was elected again in 1868. He lost his reelection in 1869, but was elected as governor again in 1870 and served from May 4, 1870 to May 16, 1871. During his tenure, an argument between the railroad and shipping industries was settled with the approval for construction of two new bridges. English ran again for reelection in 1871, and won the popular vote, but a canvassing committee found the election was fraudulent with stolen votes and erroneous totals, and awarded the governorship to Marshall Jewell.

English was elected again in 1872 to serve in the Connecticut House of Representatives. He was appointed as a Democrat to the U.S. Senate to fill the vacancy caused by the death of Orris S. Ferry and served from November 27, 1875, to May 17, 1876, when a successor was elected. 
 
An unsuccessful candidate for election in 1876 to fill the vacancy, English resumed his manufacturing and commercial activities.

In popular culture
In Steven Spielberg's 2012 Lincoln film, both English and Augustus Brandegee, his abolitionist Republican colleague from Connecticut, are given two fictional names and are both shown, erroneously, to have voted against the amendment.

Death
English died in New Haven  March 2, 1890 (age 77 years, 354 days), and is interred at Evergreen Cemetery, New Haven, Connecticut.

References

External links

In memoriam, James Edward English 1891 Biography & Autobiography
National Governors Association
The Political Graveyard
Govtrack US Congress

1812 births
1890 deaths
Democratic Party governors of Connecticut
Democratic Party members of the Connecticut House of Representatives
Democratic Party Connecticut state senators
People of Connecticut in the American Civil War
Candidates in the 1868 United States presidential election
Politicians from New Haven, Connecticut
Democratic Party United States senators from Connecticut
Democratic Party members of the United States House of Representatives from Connecticut
19th-century American politicians
Businesspeople from New Haven, Connecticut
19th-century American businesspeople